Island is a 2011 British film and an independent adaptation of the 1999 novel Island by Jane Rogers.  The film was directed by Brek Taylor and Elizabeth Mitchell who also wrote the screenplay.  It stars  Natalie Press, Colin Morgan, and Janet McTeer.  It features original music from Michael Price, and cinematography from Rain (Kathy) Li.

Plot 
Nikki Black abandoned at birth, is an unhinged twenty-nine-year-old woman on a vengeful quest to find and kill her birth mother.  Shortly after arriving on the remote island of Tigh Na Benne, she discovers a room for rent ad from a Phyllis Lovage, her mother.  Once there to rent the room, she quickly learns that she has a brother, Calum MacLeod, a loner, awkward and violent young man.  Her mother sick with cancer, and protective of her son, keeps him on a tight leash and in short order attempts to keep the two apart.  Nikki and Calum soon develop an unhealthy relationship that ends in tragedy.

Cast 
 Natalie Press as Nikki Black
 Colin Morgan as Calum MacLeod
 Janet McTeer as Phyllis Lovage
 Tanya Franks as Ruby
 Kate Stevens as Emma Lacey
 Denise Oritta as Sally
 Alex Donald as Gerry the Barman

Reception 
Island received mixed reviews. . Their top rated critic for the film, Peter Bradshaw of the daily The Guardian called it a "flimsy film", while Derek Malcolm of the tabloid London Evening Standard was critical of directors Brek Taylor and Elizabeth Mitchell.  Critic Andrew Lowry of the magazine Total Film, said that Rain (Kathy) Li's cinematography "imbues proceedings with a chilly beauty". The site Best for Film critically reviewed the film as "effortlessly and satisfyingly ambiguous".  Unsung Films reviewed the film as "different and unusual", "not keeping entirely faithful to the book",  and "unique".  The UK independent film review magazine Dog and Wolf gave the film 3 out of 5 stars.

Production 
Island was filmed on the Isle of Mull, Argyll, and the Isle of Bute, in Scotland, United Kingdom.

Release 
Island had its theatrical debut on 22 April 2011 in the UK and was later made available for viewing on DVD and the video streaming service Amazon Prime.

References

External links 
 

2011 films
2011 drama films
British drama films
Films based on British novels
Films set on fictional islands
2010s English-language films
2010s British films